Cyclopentadienylvanadium tetracarbonyl is the organovanadium compound with the formula (C5H5)V(CO)4.  An orange, diamagnetic solid, it is the principal cyclopentadienyl carbonyl of vanadium.  It can be prepared by heating a solution of vanadocene under high pressure of carbon monoxide.  As confirmed by X-ray crystallography,  the coordination sphere of vanadium consists of η5-cyclopentadienyl and four carbonyl ligands.  The molecule is a four-legged piano stool complex. The compound is soluble in common organic solvents. The compound has no commercial applications.

Reactions
Reduction with sodium amalgam gives the dianion of the tricarbonyl:
CpV(CO)4  +  2 Na  →  Na2CpV(CO)3  +  CO
Protonation of this salt gives Cp2V2(CO)5.

Heating a mixture of cycloheptatriene and cyclopentadienylvanadium tetracarbonyl gives (cycloheptatrienyl)(cyclopentadienyl)vanadium ("trovacene").

References

Cyclopentadienyl complexes
Carbonyl complexes
Organovanadium compounds
Half sandwich compounds